City Line Avenue Bridge is a historic concrete barrel arch bridge spanning the East Branch of Indian Creek and located in the Overbrook Farms neighborhood of Philadelphia, Pennsylvania.  It was built in 1913, and is a single-span bridge.  The barrel arch measures .

It was added to the National Register of Historic Places in 1988.

References

Bridges on the National Register of Historic Places in Philadelphia
Bridges completed in 1913
Overbrook, Philadelphia
1913 establishments in Pennsylvania
Road bridges on the National Register of Historic Places in Pennsylvania
Concrete bridges in the United States
Arch bridges in the United States
Bridges in Philadelphia